Ramalina thrausta is a species of fruticose lichen belonging to the family Ramalinaceae. It is found in  Europe and Northern America.

References

thrausta
Lichen species
Lichens of Europe
Lichens of North America
Lichens described in 1810